Pandah is a village and block in Ballia, Uttar Pradesh, India. Its police station is in Sikanderpur, Uttar Pradesh in Ballia district, India.

References

Villages in Ballia district